Operation Exodus was an Allied operation to repatriate Allied prisoners of war (POW)s from Europe to Britain in the closing stages of the Second World War.

The operation

After much of Europe had been liberated by allied forces, an urgent need arose to bring ex-POWs home to Britain as quickly as possible. RAF command decided to employ bomber planes for this purpose. The operation started when orders were received at RAF Oakley, Buckinghamshire, on 2 April 1945 that 300 repatriated prisoners of war were arriving by air at 11:00. All arrangements were made for their reception and the provision of refreshments laid on in the Social Club. The arrival was postponed to the following day. 

Seven Dakotas landed with repatriated POWs on 3 April and more throughout the month, until by the end of April, 72 Dakotas had brought 1,787 POWs. Operation Exodus was in full swing and May 1945 was even busier with 443 Avro Lancasters, 103 Dakotas, 51 Handley Page Halifaxes, 31 Consolidated Liberators, 3 Short Stirlings, 3 Lockheed Hudsons and 2 Boeing B-17 Flying Fortresses bringing 15,088 personnel.

References

External links

 Royal Air Force Museum. The Long Trip Home

Airlifts
Battles and operations of World War II
Aerial operations and battles of World War II involving the United Kingdom